The India cricket team toured Sri Lanka between 18 July and 2 September 2001. The two sides played a triangular ODI series also involving New Zealand, following which they played a three-match Test series. India's tour also included a one-day and a three-day fixture ahead of the ODI and Test series respectively.

Sri Lanka won the ODI series defeating India in the final. In the Test series that followed, they beat India by a 2–1 margin, winning the first and final Tests, while India won the second. It was Sri Lanka's second series win against India and first at home after three losses that followed the win against Australia in September 1999. Mahela Jayawardene made 296 runs and was the top-scorer for either sides, while Muttiah Muralitharan, who picked 23 wickets, was named the player of the series.

Squads

Sachin Tendulkar pulled out of the tour after a scan of his injured right toe, from hairline fracture, revealed to not have healed. With that, he missed a Test for the first time since his debut in 1989 after playing 84 consecutive games.

Tour match

Test Series

1st Test

2nd Test

3rd Test

References

External links
 Tour home at ESPN Cricinfo

2001
International cricket competitions in 2001
2001 in Sri Lankan cricket
Sri Lankan cricket seasons from 2000–01
2001 in Indian cricket